Acacia whibleyana (common name - Whibley wattle, Whibley's wattle) is a shrub belonging to the genus Acacia, section Plurinerves. It is native to South Australia.

Description
Like most species of Acacia it has phyllodes rather than true leaves. It blooms between August and October producing simple inflorescences that are grouped in pairs in the axils and have spherical flower-heads with a diameter of  containing 18 to 19 golden coloured flowers..

Distribution and habitat
It is found on limestone and loam, sometimes near salt swamps, but only in the near-coastal areas south of Tumby Bay on the Eyre Peninsula, South Australia.

Taxonomy and naming 
It was first described by Richard Sumner Cowan and Bruce Maslin in 1995. The species epithet, whibleyana, honours  David J.E. Whibley who contributed considerably to the knowledge of South Australian wattles.

Conservation status 
It is listed as "Endangered" under the federal EPBC Act.

See also
 List of Acacia species

References

External links
Kew herbarium specimen: K000800876

whibleyana
Flora of South Australia
Plants described in 1995
Taxa named by Bruce Maslin
Taxa named by Richard Sumner Cowan